Lake Kerr is a small lake located in Marion County, Florida, USA. Eureka and Salt Springs are located near Lake Kerr. It is also located very close to Lake George and the St. Johns River. The water is clear like many lakes found in Florida. The census-designated place of Lake Kerr surrounds the water body.

The lake bears the name of R. B. Kerr, a surveyor.

References

Lakes of Marion County, Florida
Reservoirs in Florida